The 1995 Florida Gators football team represented the University of Florida in the sport of American football during the 1995 NCAA Division I-A football season. The 1995 season was the Florida Gators' sixth year under head coach Steve Spurrier and was one of the most successful in school history, as the Gators finished the regular season unbeaten and untied for the first time (the 1911 team went 5–0–1).

The Gators used coach Spurrier's pass-heavy "fun 'n gun" offense". Led by Heisman Trophy finalist quarterback Danny Wuerffel, the offense set many school and conference offensive records, including passing touchdowns, passing yards per game, total yards per game, and points per game, among others.

After finishing the regular season 12–0 (8–0 in the SEC), Florida defeated the Arkansas Razorbacks 34–3 in the 1995 SEC Championship Game. As the No. 2 ranked team, the Gators were invited to play in the 1996 Fiesta Bowl, which was the Bowl Alliance national championship game. In Tempe, Florida lost 24–62 to the No. 1 ranked Nebraska Cornhuskers but remained No. 2 in the final AP poll.

Before the season
Prior to the season, the old Bermuda grass was replaced with newly grown sod.

Schedule

Roster

Season summary

Houston

In the opener, Florida was off to a shaky start, but was able to defeat the 45-point underdog Houston Cougars 45–21. The defense was suspect, surrendering 421 total yards to a Cougar team which won a single game the year before.

"We managed to get away with a victory but Houston was probably better prepared than we were", said coach Spurrier.

Kentucky

In the second week of play, the Gators easily beat the Kentucky Wildcats 42–7. Third-team tailback Terry Jackson picked up the load when Elijah Williams and Fred Taylor were injured, rushing for 138 yards and three touchdowns.

Wuerffel sat out after tossing a 13-yard touchdown to Chris Doering to go up 35–0.

Tennessee

In the first major test of the season, the Gators routed the rival and eighth-ranked Tennessee Volunteers 62–37. On the first play from scrimmage, Volunteer quarterback Peyton Manning connected with receiver Joey Kent for a 72-yard gain.  On the next play, Manning threw a touchdown pass to Marcus Nash, giving the Vols a 7–0 lead only 15 seconds into the game. After another Manning touchdown pass and two Gator turnovers, the Vols held a 30–14 advantage late in the second quarter in front of a stunned Florida Field crowd.

Wuerffel led the Gators to an answering score, cutting the lead to 30–21 with a touchdown pass in the last minute of the first half.  That would be the beginning of a historic run, as Florida scored 48 straight points despite a torrential second half downpour and won 62–37.  Many records were broken in the game: Wuerffel threw an SEC record six touchdown passes; Tennessee set school records for most points scored in a loss and most points given up in the modern era.  After the game, Sports Illustrated chose to put Wuerffel on its cover instead of Manning.

Ole Miss

The next week was a lackluster performance versus Ole Miss. Though a 28–10 win for the Gators, the game involved just 59 offensive plays.

Florida's first touchdown came with a 42-yard run on a reverse, by Jacquez Green on a 4th-and-2. On Florida's next possession, Green went up against two defenders and snatched a pass for a 40-yard gain, setting up a 13-yard touchdown pass from Wuerffel to Ike Hilliard. An 8-yard pass to Chris Doering was his 101st career catch and gave Florida a 21–3 cushion early in the second quarter.

LSU

In Baton Rouge, Florida beat the LSU Tigers 28–10. The Gators mixed in the option into its normal offense to counter LSU and its eight-man front.  Wuerffel called it one of his worst games, and threw three interceptions in the first half.

On the Gators' third possession, a crucial first down was had by an option pitch to Elijah Williams. Later on that same drive, the Gators scored on a third-and-goal from inside the 5-yard line using the same play to go up 7–0. Fred Taylor had short runs for two more touchdowns.  LSU's offense seemed to come awake shortly before the half, scoring its 10 points quickly. LSU's touchdown came on a touchdown pass to defensive tackle Anthony McFarland. Florida scored its final touchdown on a 21-yard pass from Wuerffel to Reidel Anthony.

Auburn
    

Florida won against the Auburn Tigers 49 to 38, the first time Spurrier defeated Auburn coach Terry Bowden. The Gators committed two turnovers early against Auburn, which led 10–0 three minutes into the game.

The game stayed close throughout the first half. After the early, 10–0 Auburn lead, Reidel Anthony returned the ensuing kickoff for a touchdown. Auburn added a field goal, and passes to Jacquez Green set up a Fred Taylor touchdown run to give Florida its first lead of the game, 14–13. Auburn then retook the lead, 20–14; and after a short touchdown run by Elijah Williams, it was 21–20.  Florida led 35-20 at the half.

Wuerffel threw a touchdown pass to Ike Hilliard and two to Chris Doering such that early in the third quarter it was already 42–20. One more touchdown was had by Doering. Auburn scored thrice more since the half, each time failing on a two-point conversion. The Tigers' last score came on a long run by Stephen Davis.

Georgia
  

 
Florida beat  the Bulldogs 52–17, becoming the first visitor in Sanford Stadium history to score more than 50 points.

Florida was ahead 21–0 less than 12 minutes into the contest.  Gators starting quarterback Danny Wuerffel threw for 242 yards and five touchdowns before leaving the game in the third quarter.  "Danny Wuerffel was near perfect in the game", Spurrier said. "He only had one bad throw." With the Gators leading 38–17 in the fourth quarter, Gators backup quarterback Eric Kresser threw for two more touchdowns, one with 1:21 remaining, to make the final score 52–17.  After the game, Gators coach Steve Spurrier stated that he had wanted to be the first opponent to hang "half a hundred" on the Bulldogs in their own stadium because "we heard no one had ever done that before."  The Gators' fifty-two points remains the record for most scored against Georgia "between the hedges."

Northern Illinois

At homecoming the following week, backup quarterback Eric Kresser played in place of Wuerffel for the Northern Illinois game, a 58–20 defeat of the Huskies. Kresser threw for a school record  458 yards, breaking the record Terry Dean set against Southwestern Louisiana in 1993. Kresser passed for six touchdowns to six different players, including a 96-yard pass to Jacquez Green on a crossing route.

Despite the performance, Spurrier felt Kresser threw better in pre-game warmups. The Gators improved to 8-0 for the first time since 1928.

South Carolina

    
   
    
     

 
      
   

In Columbia, Florida clinched the SEC East title with a crushing 63–7 win over the South Carolina Gamecocks. Wuerffel threw for 304 yards including five touchdowns in the first half.

After a blocked punt, Wuerffel hit Hilliard with an 18-yard touchdown to go up 21–0 early into the second quarter. Florida used its substitutes after a 38-yard touchdown run by Elijah Williams midway through the third quarter. Kresser hit Green on a 39-yard touchdown pass on the first play of the fourth quarter.

Vanderbilt
   
    
   
    
      
      
   

Returning home the next week, Florida triumphed over the  Vanderbilt Commodores 38–7. Chris Doering was named SEC Offensive Player of the Week with a season-high 11 catches for 169 yards. Elijah Williams had 128 yards rushing, including a 70-yard touchdown run.

The Gators were plagued by sacks and poor play, but played aggressive defense. In the second half, Vanderbilt wide receiver Fred Baker and Florida nickelback Ben Hanks were both ejected for fighting. Hanks apologized afterwards, and was suspended for a half the next week.

Florida State

    
    
   
    
    
    
    
    
    
    

The rival Florida State Seminoles were beaten 35–24. Danny Wuerffel threw for 453 yards and four touchdowns as Florida held off a second-half rally by Florida State and erased the memories of the "Choke at Doak" from the previous season.

A 42-yard pass to Ike Hilliard, who evaded multiple defenders on the run after the catch, made it 21–6. The Gators intercepted the Noles three times in the last quarter. Florida tied the all-time school record for consecutive wins
with 11.

Postseason

Arkansas
 
    
   

    
     

The Gators faced the Arkansas Razorbacks in the SEC Championship Game and ran away with it 34–3. The Razorbacks led 3-0 after a long, game-opening drive on which tailback Madre Hill suffered a knee injury.

Following a 36-yard field goal from Arkansas, Florida drove 80 yards in seven plays, with Wuerffel completing a 22-yard touchdown pass to Chris Doering. The Gators never looked back, scoring 34 unanswered points and securing a spot against Nebraska in the national title game.

Nebraska

The Gators faced #1 ranked Nebraska in the Fiesta Bowl for the Bowl Alliance national championship. Florida received the opening kickoff and drove to the Nebraska 5, before settling for a 23-yard Bart Edmiston field goal. Aided by good field position, the Huskers countered on their opening series with a 53-yard scoring drive, capped by a 16-yard cross-field throwback pass from Tommie Frazier to Lawrence Phillips. The Gators blocked the Huskers' extra point, and Nebraska led 6–3. Late in the period, Florida went back ahead on a short 1-yard sneak from Wuerffel and led 10–6.  As the Gators scored, CBS' Terry Donahue stated, "Nebraska better not get too far behind." The Huskers then put the game out of reach with a 29-point explosion in the second quarter, making it 35–10 at the half.

Florida continued to struggle against Nebraska's aggressive, blitzing defense. In the third period, on second down from the Nebraska 25, Cornhuskers quarterback Frazier ran an option play to the right, and decided to keep the ball rather than pitch. He gained 11 yards before being met by a group of Florida defenders at the 36-yard line, which he then dragged approximately 10 yards before shrugging them off and breaking free, streaking 75 yards down the sideline to give Nebraska a 49–18 lead. Frazier had broken no fewer than seven tackles on the play. The game ended 62 to 24.

For much of the summer of 1996, a common joke on ESPN was "Hey Gators, Nebraska just scored again."  The Gators would use the Fiesta Bowl rout as a rallying point for the 1996 season, in which they won the first national championship in school history. The 1995 Nebraska squad has been voted as the greatest college football team of all-time in many surveys, including the all-time Sagarin ratings. An ESPN poll has them at #3, only behind the 1971 Huskers and 1972 USC Trojans.

Notes

References

Florida
Florida Gators football seasons
Southeastern Conference football champion seasons
Florida Gators football